Gazin in Iran may refer to:
Gazin, Sistan and Baluchestan (گزين - Gazīn)
Gazin, Zanjan (گزين - Gazīn)
Gazin Rural District (گزين - Gazīn), in Khuzestan Province